Cosmic Wartoad is an action game developed by Denton Designs for the ZX Spectrum. It was published by Ocean and released in the UK in 1985.

Gameplay and Plot
The queen of the cosmic wartoads has been kidnapped by the Rygellian Slime Beasts, turned into a human and is being held captive beneath the Slime King's Sludge Saw, which descends over the course of ninety minutes and will kill her if it is not stopped.

The player controls the Cosmic Wartoad as he attempts to rescue the queen. To achieve this he must travel across the Rygellian Timevoid, an 8x8 grid of "nodes", by entering a node, successfully completing the minigame within, and then entering an adjacent node, all the while collecting the eight pieces of the Cosmic Toolkit that will shut down the Sludge Saw. Each node contains one of several repeating minigames, which typically involve the Cosmic Wartoad fighting enemies.

The game finishes either when the Cosmic Wartoad successfully collects all eight pieces of the Toolkit and navigates his way across the grid to shut down the saw; when the Cosmic Wartoad loses all of his three lives; or when the ninety-minute game period expires.

Reception
The game received generally positive reviews on its release. Crash awarded it 88%, Sinclair User gave it four stars (out of a possible five), Your Sinclair scored it 8/10 and Your Computer rated it 3/5.

References 

1985 video games
Denton Designs games
Ocean Software games
Single-player video games
Video games about amphibians
Video games developed in the United Kingdom
ZX Spectrum games
ZX Spectrum-only games